Crestwood High School may refer to:

Crestwood High School (New South Wales), Baulkham Hills, New South Wales
Crestwood High School (Iowa), Cresco, Iowa
Crestwood High School (Michigan), Dearborn Heights, Michigan
Crestwood High School (Ohio), Mantua, Ohio
Crestwood High School (Pennsylvania), Mountain Top, Pennsylvania
Crestwood High School (South Carolina), Sumter, South Carolina
Crestwood High School (Georgia), Sandy Springs, Georgia
Crestwood Secondary School, Peterborough, Ontario